Amira al Hayb (born in 1985) was Israel's first female Bedouin-Arab soldier in a combat position. Al-Hayb served in the Israel Defense Forces and the Israel Border Police.

Biography
Amira al Hayb was born in Tuba-Zangariyye in the Upper Galilee. Her family moved to Wadi Hamaam when she was a few months old. At the age of 19, al Hayb decided to join the Israel Defense Forces. While the recruitment of male Bedouin is common in Israel, this was considered taboo for women. Nur al Hayb, "father of the Bedouin soldiers," a disabled IDF veteran from Eilabun village, came to her aid.

Al Hayb had to undergo recruit training twice due to language problems but eventually joined the Israel Border Police. Her position as the first female Bedouin soldier attracted media attention. She has met with many leading figures in Israel, among them the Israeli President Moshe Katsav and the Israeli Chief of Staff, Shaul Mofaz.

Amira's brother, Taysir Hayb, received an 8-year prison sentence for manslaughter in the death of International Solidarity Movement activist Tom Hurndall, but was released after five years.

See also 
 Elinor Joseph
 Women in the Israel Defense Forces
 Women in the military

References

External links 
An interview with Amira al Hayb (Hebrew)

1985 births
Living people
Arab citizens of Israel
Bedouin Israelis
Israeli Muslims
Israeli soldiers
Israeli female military personnel
Women in 21st-century warfare
Women soldiers